Bergen New Bridge Medical Center (previously known as Bergen Regional Medical Center) is an acute and long-term care hospital located in Paramus, New Jersey, US. The hospital campus also houses a nursing home and a mental health facility.

The facility first opened in 1916 as the Bergen County Isolation Hospital,housing patients with tuberculosis and other contagious diseases. It later became known as Bergen Pines, inspired by the planting of more than 1,000 young pine trees donated in 1924 by Hackensack's Pioneer Masonic Lodge. In 1998, Bergen County contracted with the Solomon Health Group to form Bergen Regional Medical Center.

References

External links

Paramus, New Jersey
Hospitals in New Jersey
Hospitals in Bergen County, New Jersey